Mario Casati (born 3 September 1944) is an Italian boxer. He competed in the men's middleweight event at the 1968 Summer Olympics.

References

External links
 

1944 births
Living people
Italian male boxers
Olympic boxers of Italy
Boxers at the 1968 Summer Olympics
People from Carate Brianza
Mediterranean Games gold medalists for Italy
Mediterranean Games medalists in boxing
Competitors at the 1967 Mediterranean Games
Middleweight boxers
Sportspeople from the Province of Monza e Brianza